Lamonte Centerius Turner (born July 4, 1997) is an American professional basketball player for Arka Gdynia of the Polish Basketball League. He played college basketball for the Tennessee Volunteers.

High school career
Turner played high school basketball for Sparkman High School in Harvest, Alabama. As a junior he averaged 13 points, 5.5 rebounds and four assists per game, helping lead the Senators to a 29–8 record and the Class 6A state championship game. Turner transferred to IMG Academy in Bradenton, Florida. He was ranked the No. 56 overall prospect in the Class of 2016 according to Rivals. Turner reclassified to 2015 and signed with Tennessee on April 28, 2015, choosing the Volunteers over offers from Florida, Florida State, Louisville, Wichita State, Alabama and Auburn.

College career

Turner was forced to redshirt his freshman season. He averaged 8.2 points, 2.5 rebounds and 2.7 assists per game as a redshirt freshman starting half of his 32 games. As a sophomore, Turner averaged 10.9 points, 3.2 rebounds and 2.2 assists per game, shooting 39.9 percent from the field and 39.5 percent from behind the three-point line. He was named SEC Sixth Man of the Year. He averaged 11.0 points and 3.8 assists per game as a junior on a team that reached the Sweet 16. He dealt with shoulder soreness during the beginning of the season. Coming into his senior season, Turner was named to the Bob Cousy Award watchlist. He had 13 points in a win over Alabama State on November 20 and surpassed the 1,000 point threshold. On November 30, 2019, Turner hit a buzzer-beating three-pointer from the corner to give Tennessee a 72–69 win over VCU in the Emerald Classic. As a senior, Turner averaged 12.3 points and 7.1 assists per game in 11 games but struggled with his shooting, hitting 23.4 percent of his three-pointers. Following a win against Jacksonville State on December 21, 2019, Turner announced that he would have season-ending shoulder surgery.

Professional career
On September 21, 2021, Turner signed his first professional contract with Arka Gdynia of the Polish Basketball League.

Career statistics

College

|-
| style="text-align:left;"| 2015–16
| style="text-align:left;"| Tennessee
| style="text-align:center;" colspan="11"|  Redshirt
|-
| style="text-align:left;"| 2016–17
| style="text-align:left;"| Tennessee
| 32 || 6 || 20.7 || .355 || .328 || .769 || 2.5 || 2.7 || .6 || .2 || 8.2
|-
| style="text-align:left;"| 2017–18
| style="text-align:left;"| Tennessee
| 35 || 0 || 25.3 || .399 || .395 || .882 || 3.2 || 2.2 || .7 || .1 || 10.9
|-
| style="text-align:left;"| 2018–19
| style="text-align:left;"| Tennessee
| 28 || 19 || 31.0 || .420 || .320 || .784 || 2.7 || 3.8 || 1.3 || .1 || 10.9
|-
| style="text-align:left;"| 2019–20
| style="text-align:left;"| Tennessee
| 11 || 11 || 33.7 || .310 || .234 || .746 || 3.5 || 7.1 || 1.8 || .2 || 12.3
|- class="sortbottom"
| style="text-align:center;" colspan="2"| Career
| 106 || 36 || 26.3 || .382 || .341 || .801 || 2.9 || 3.3 || .9 || .1 || 10.2

References

External links
Tennessee Volunteers bio

1997 births
Living people
American men's basketball players
Basketball players from Alabama
Point guards
Sportspeople from Florence, Alabama
Tennessee Volunteers basketball players